Andrei Dmitrievich Polyanin (born 1 November 1951) is a Russian mathematician. He is a creator and Editor-in-Chief of EqWorld.

Education
Polyanin graduated with honors from the Faculty of Mechanics and Mathematics at Lomonosov Moscow State University in 1974 (M.Sc.). He received his Ph.D. in 1981 and D.Sc. in 1986 (mathematics and physics) at the Institute for Problems in Mechanics of the Russian Academy of Sciences.

Professional career and membership
Polyanin has been working at the Institute for Problems in Mechanics of the Russian Academy of Sciences since 1975 (professor since 1991). In 2004, he also became professor of mathematics at Bauman Moscow State Technical University. He is member of the Russian National Committee on Theoretical and Applied Mechanics and the Mathematics and Mechanics Expert Council of the Higher Attestation Commission of the Russian Federation. He is editor of the book series Differential and Integral Equations and Their Applications (Chapman & Hall – CRC Press, London – Boca Raton) and member of the editorial board of the journal Theoretical Foundations of Chemical Engineering.

Interests and achievements
Polyanin is a scientist with broad interests who has made significant contribution to the theory of differential and integral equations, mathematical physics, applied and engineering mathematics, fluid mechanics, theory of heat and mass transfer, and chemical engineering sciences. He has also contributed to the development of a number of new exact and approximate analytical methods for mathematics and engineering sciences, including the methods of generalized and functional separation of variables, discrete group approach, functional constraints method, asymptotic analogies method, model equations method, and others. He has obtained exact solutions for several thousand ordinary differential, partial differential, delay partial differential, integral and functional equations.

Polyanin is the author of more than 30 books in English, Russian, German, and Bulgarian as well as over 160 research papers and three patents. He is known in the scientific community for his fundamental series of handbooks on differential and integral equations; many of the results included in these books were obtained by him personally.

In 1991, Polyanin was awarded a Chaplygin Prize of the Russian Academy of Sciences for his research in mechanics. In 2001, he received an award from the Ministry of Education of the Russian Federation.

Major books

References

External links
 EqWorld home page
 Polyanin's personal web page
 Website of the Institute for Problems in Mechanics, Russian Academy of Sciences

1951 births
Living people
20th-century Russian mathematicians
21st-century Russian mathematicians
Moscow State University alumni